Vaterlandslied is the name of several patriotic German poems. The most famous one is "Ich bin ein deutsches Mädchen" written by Friedrich Gottlieb Klopstock in 1770 and dedicated to Johanna Elisabeth von Winthem.

Historic background 
Friedrich Gottlieb Klopstock already was a devout patriot as a youth, as is shown by a War Song written in 1749 honouring the Prussian king Frederick the Great. When the king, however, did not patronize German artists and poets but declared his love for French culture, Klopstock thought that it was up to him to defend German poetry.

Due to the political development during his lifetime, the disappointment with regard to the king's distaste of German culture, and the zeitgeist, his patriotism did not refer to Klopstock's present but to the past. The War Song consequently was rededicated to Henry the Fowler, and Arminius became a regular figure in Klopstock's œuvres.

The Vaterlandslied as a paean of German patriotism joins this list of literature exalting the nation. It was originally written for Johanna Elisabeth von Winthem, Klopstock's stepdaughter, who still was a child in 1770.

Klopstock's lyrics

Music
As the poem became very popular, several composers set its lyrics to music. Among them are:
Johann Friedrich Reichardt, 1773
Carl Philipp Emanuel Bach, 1774
Christian Gottlob Neefe, 1776 and 1785
Christoph Willibald Gluck, 1786
Franz Schubert, 1815, D 287

Other Vaterlandslieder
Matthias Claudius replied to Klopstock′s poem and wrote ″Ich bin ein deutscher Jüngling″ (I am a German lad). Both Joseph Martin Kraus and Maria Theresia von Paradis provided a melody for the song.

August Silberstein wrote a poem of the same name for which Anton Bruckner composed the music: Vaterlandslied, WAB 92.

The most famous song of that name, besides Klopstock′s version, is, however, Ernst Moritz Arndt′s ″″ (The God who made iron grow), a patriotic anthem written during the Wars of Liberation against Napoleonic France. In the poem he incites his fellow countrymen to fight against the French invaders, and denounces those who actively or passively aid the occupiers and thus betray their country.

See also 
 Hermann und Thusnelda

References

External links 
 Schubert′s version on YouTube (start: 12:41 min.) and Amazon
 Excerpts of Gluck's (Nr. 12), Schubert's (14) and Bach's (18) version on a CD by the label Gramola, and on Amazon.
 Der Gott, der Eisen wachsen ließ by Arndt on YouTube.

German patriotic songs
German culture
German nationalism
German music